Impersonating a public servant, impersonating a public officer or impersonating a public official is a crime or misdemeanor in several jurisdictions. It consists of pretending to hold a public office and exercise that authority or attempt to induce another person to do something. There have for example been charges for impersonating a fire inspector, a city code compliance officer and a child protective services official.

See also 

 Police impersonation
 Military impostor

Sources 

Crime
Impostors